GQ by Citroën is a concept compact executive hatchback coupe designed by Citroën for the British market. It has been created in cooperation with the magazine GQ. The GQ by Citroën's competitors in real life are the Hyundai Veloster Turbo, Volkswagen Scirocco R and the Renault Mégane R.S.

References

Citroën concept vehicles
Rear-wheel-drive vehicles
Hatchbacks
Coupés